João Luiz may refer to:

 João Luiz (footballer, born 1971), João Luiz Ferreira Baptista, Brazilian football defender
 João Luiz (footballer, born 1985), João Luiz Ramires Vieira, Brazilian football defensive midfielder